National Highway 151A, commonly referred to as NH 151A is a national highway in India. It is a secondary route of National Highway 51.  NH-151A runs in the state of Gujarat in India.

Route 
NH151A connects Dwarka, Khambaliya, Jamnagar, Dhrol, Amran and Maliya in the state of Gujarat.

Junctions  
 
  Terminal near Dwarka.
  near Jamnagar
  Terminal near Maliya.

See also 
 List of National Highways in India
 List of National Highways in India by stateMK

References

External links 

 NH 151A on OpenStreetMap

National highways in India
National Highways in Gujarat